Paterno is a 2012 biography of the Penn State football coach Joe Paterno book by sportswriter Joe Posnanski.  The Paterno family granted Posnanski a great deal of access during the writing process, which included the time period of the Penn State child sex abuse scandal and Paterno's firing.  The book debuted at #1 on The New York Times Best Seller list for hardcover non-fiction best-seller.

References

2012 non-fiction books
American biographies
American football books
American non-fiction books
Joe Paterno
Penn State Nittany Lions football
Simon & Schuster books